The presumption of regularity is a presumption that forms part of the law of evidence of England and Wales.

It is expressed by the maxim of law omnia praesumuntur rite et solemniter esse acta donec probetur in contrarium, which may be shortened to omnia praesumuntur rite et solemniter esse acta or omnia praesumuntur rite esse acta.

Official actions
Where it has been proved that an "official act" has been done, it will be presumed, until the contrary is proved, that the said act "complied with any necessary formalities" and that the person who did it was "duly appointed".

This is a presumption of law.

The following cases are relevant to this presumption:

R v Gordon (1789) 1 Leach 515, (1789) 1 East PC 315
R v Jones (1806) 31 St Tr 251, (1806) 2 Camp 131
R v Verelst (1813) 3 Camp 432
R v Catesby (1824) 2 B & C 814, (1824) 4 Dow & Ry KB 434, (1824) 2 Dow & Ry MC 278
R v Rees (1834) 6 C & P 606
R v Murphy (1837) 8 C & P 297
R v Townsend (1841) C & Mar 178
R v Newton (1843) 1 C & K 469
R v Manwaring (1856) 26 LJMC 10, (1856) Dears & B 132, (1856) 7 Cox 192
R v Cresswell (1876) 1 QBD 446, (1876) 33 LT 760, (1876) 40 JP 536, (1876) 13 Cox 126
R v Stewart (1876) 13 Cox 296
R v Roberts (1878) 14 Cox 101, (1878) 42 JP 630, (1878) 38 LT 690, CCR
 Gibbins v Skinner [1951] 2 K.B. 379, [1951] 1 All E.R. 1049, [1951] 1 T.L.R. 1159, (1951) 115 J.P. 360, 49 L.G.R. 713
Campbell v Wallsend Shipway and Engineering Co Ltd [1977] Crim LR 351, DC
Dillon v R [1982] AC 484, [1982] 2 WLR 538, [1982] 1 All ER 1017, 74 Cr App R 274, [1982] Crim LR 438, PC
Gage v Jones [1983] RTR 508, DC
Kynaston v Director of Public Prosecutions, 87 Cr App R 200, DC

Business transactions
Where it has been proved that "necessary business transactions" have been carried out, it will be presumed, until the contrary is proved, that the said transactions were carried out in the order (if any) that they are required to be carried out. See Eaglehill Ltd v J Needham (Builders) Ltd [1973] AC 992, HL.

Mechanical contraptions
Where it has been proved that a "mechanical device" is normally in "good working order", it will be presumed, until the contrary is proved, that it was in good working order on any relevant occasion. See Tingle Jacobs & Co v Kennedy [1964] 1 WLR 638, CA

References

Evidence law